is a Japanese athlete competing in the 400 metres hurdles. He represented his country at the 2016 Summer Olympics reaching the semifinals.

His personal best in the event is 48.62 seconds set in Rio de Janeiro in 2016.

International competitions

References

External links 
 
 
 

1991 births
Living people
Sportspeople from Yamanashi Prefecture
Japanese male hurdlers
Olympic male hurdlers
Olympic athletes of Japan
Athletes (track and field) at the 2016 Summer Olympics
Competitors at the 2013 Summer Universiade
Japan Championships in Athletics winners
Waseda University alumni
20th-century Japanese people
21st-century Japanese people